MedEspoir is a Franco-Tunisian medical tourism company founded in 2009. Its activity is centered around the organization of medical trips for the general public with the aim of performing various types of operations in Tunisia. MedEspoir was founded by Aymen Boujbel. He is the Chairman and CEO. The creation of MedEspoir is closely linked to the development of plastic surgery throughout the world.

MedEspoir slogan is "Invest in your health, quality has a price".

Activity 
MedEspoir and its medical center,  the MedEspoir Clinic, specializes in the conception and realization of medical stays around different practices. Aesthetic and reconstructive surgery with its facial surgery, body surgery and breast surgery. Bariatric surgery also known as obesity surgery. Dental treatments particularly those that are not or only partially reimbursed in the country of origin : Dental implants, dental veneers, crowns. Eye surgery for alternative solutions to vision correction with glasses.

The different specialties of general surgery (Orthopedics, oncology, nephrology...). In this last field, MedEspoir stands out as the first choice for patients from the Maghreb and sub-Saharan Africa. Development in recent years, MedEspoir has expanded its range of health tourism destinations by setting it location in Turkey and Egypt.

Media 
MedEspoir and its activities have been the subject of numerous media reports in various countries. Programs on M6, NRJ 12, France3, TF1, W9 and RTS have offered viewers an overview of patient care. These reports explored the motivations of patients and showed in detail the stages of the medical stay in the country of arrival, Tunisia or Turkey. The media, particularly French, also mentioned MedEspoir for its strong commitment to supporting reality TV stars. Personalities such as Benjamin Macé, Loana, Smaïl or Nadege Lacroix have participated in programs or videos related to MedEspoir Clinic.

References

External links

Companies of Tunisia